The 2014–15 TVL Premier League or 2014–15 Port Vila Premier League is the 21st edition of the Port Vila Premier League top division.

The top four of the league qualify for the 2015 VFF National Super League and the lowest team relegates to the 2015–16 TVL First Division.

Before the season, the 2014 TVL Smile Cup was held as an opening tournament, with Tafea FC taking out the title.

Teams
Amicale FC
Erakor Golden Star
Ifira Black Bird
Narak Tegapu
Shepherds United
Spirit 08
Tafea FC
Tupuji Imere

Standings

TVL Smile Cup
Before the 2014–15 TVL Premier League, the TVL Smile Cup was hosted as an opening cup at Port Vila Municipal Stadium. The 2014 TVL Smile Cup was won by Tafea.

Teams
Amicale FC
Erakor Golden Star
Ifira Black Bird
Narak Tegapu
Shepherds United
Spirit 08
Tafea
Tupuji Imere

Matches
The 8 teams participating were split into 2 groups, with the top 2 from each group advancing to the semi-finals, and the winners of the two semi-finals facing off in the grand final.

Group stage

Group A

Group B

Playoffs

Semi-finals

Grand Final

Top goalscorers

References

External links
 

Port Vila Football League seasons
1
Vanuatu
Vanuatu